Ostracocoelia mirabilis is a species of tephritid or fruit flies in the genus Ostracocoelia of the family Tephritidae.

Distribution
Mexico, South to Costa Rica.

References

Tephritinae
Insects described in 1893
Diptera of North America